Krugerspos is a hamlet 25 km north-east of Lydenburg and 25 km south-west of Ohrigstad. It was named after Pieter Ernst Kruger, owner of the farm on which it was laid out.

References

Populated places in the Thaba Chweu Local Municipality